Hong Mei (born 11 January 1982) is a Chinese female shot putter, discus and hammer thrower, who won two individual gold medal at the Youth World Championships.

References

External links

1982 births
Living people
Chinese female shot putters
Chinese female discus throwers
Chinese female hammer throwers
Sportspeople from Nantong
People from Hai'an
20th-century Chinese women
21st-century Chinese women